Ilkley Golf Club is a golf club in North Yorkshire, England, just outside the town of Ilkley in West Yorkshire. It is located about a mile to the northwest of Ilkley and southeast of Addingham. The River Wharfe flows past the course. It was established in 1890.

History

Ilkley is the oldest club in the West Riding and the third oldest in Yorkshire (Beverly and East Riding Golf Club 1889); a 9-hole course was established on Rombald's Moor at the behest of Ben Hirst and Alfred Potter in June 1890. The location for the original 9-hole course was planned with assistance from George Strath, the club professional at Southport and George Kay, the club professional at Redcar was employed at £1 per week to lay out the course.

In October 1897 the committee negotiated with Myddleton Estate to rent 70 acres of pasture running along the north side of the River Wharfe. Work began on the new course in February 1898 and was completed by July of that year.  The course was designed by Alister MacKenzie and Harry Colt and measures 6,262 yards. The old links course on the moor was leased to an Ilkley Tradesmen's group and golf continued to be played there until the Moor Club was wound up in 1947.  On 13 April 1907, Harry Vardon and noted golf architect James Braid played an exhibition match to mark the opening of the new clubhouse. In 1921 the course was described as an "excellent links" course. In 1970 many trees were planted around the course, changing its appearance. The club has hosted the competition for the OCCA and West Riding Golf Trophies, the Yorkshire Ladies' Challenge Bowl in 1955 and the British Girls' Open Championship in 1969.

The 19th bar in the Clubhouse has on display one of the golf balls that Alan Shepard took to the Moon on Apollo 14 in 1971. The ball was given by Shephard to Father Paddy Roche who bequeathed it to the club.

Members
A number of professionals started or played at Ilkley, including Harry Vardon, Tom Vardon, Sam Whiting, William Baxter, John Ball, Peter Thomson, Bill Ferguson, Colin Montgomerie, Mark James, and James Hepworth.   Harry Vardon won his first prize as a professional golfer on this course in 1893. Montgomerie met Ferguson at the club when Ferguson was club pro and Montgomerie was just a boy.

Professionals

1890–1892 George Kay
1892–1893 T P Waggot
1893–1900 Tom Vardon
1900–1903 Douglas McEwan
1903–1911 Walter Toogood
1911–1921 Sam Whiting
1921–1926 James MacKenzie
1926–1964 Jock D Henderson
1964–1969 David L Melville
1969–1979 William J Ferguson (Bill Ferguson)
1979–2015 John L Hammond
2015–2022 Andrew P Driver
2023-current date Andrew R Turner

References

Saywell, J., (1990) A History Of Ilkley Golf Club, Otley, Smith Settle.

External links
Official site

Golf clubs and courses in North Yorkshire
1890 establishments in England
Ilkley